The Melbourne High School Old Boys Football Club (abbreviated "MHSOBFC", nicknamed the Unicorns) is an Australian rules football club based in the inner suburb of South Yarra, Victoria.

The club, founded in August 1907, has won premierships in various grades, nine times over its history: in 1937, 1939, 1946, 1952, 1960, 1961, 1991, 2004 and 2009. It currently plays in the Victorian Amateur Football Association.

Melbourne HSOBFC is part of the "Melbourne High School Old Boys Association" (MHSOBA), an organization run primarily by alumni of Melbourne High School. It is known in the non-Melbourne High community primarily for its long tradition of sports clubs. Apart from football, other activities hosted by the Association are cricket and field hockey.

History 
The team's founding in August 1907 was an unofficial game between the club and the school. The school side won by 58 points, but the Old Boys returned the next year to play the match again. The game became a yearly fixture. In 1912 the MHSOBFC had its first victory over past students. The games were discontinued during both World Wars, but continued to be played between them. In 1923 the club proposed to make the move to the Metropolitan Amateur Association, but it was not until 1929 that the club entered the premiership points race. On 24 April 1928, the football club was formally established. It was fairly successful, albeit in a low grade, early in its history. A constant finals contender, it finally won the D grade in 1937, earning promotion. It won the C grade in 1939, and then after won the B grade in 1946. Since then has moved intermittently between the B and A grades barring a decline in the 1980s.

In 1939, as the MHSOB was in the midst of its rise to the A grade, the U19 club was formed. This club was immediately successful, winning the premiership in 1943 and 1945. The club did not win a premiership during the 50s, but in the 60s it became a formidable force. It won the premiership in 1960, 1961, 1962, 1963 and 1964. The five-year record run has not been matched again, with the U19s winning only two more premierships: in 1985 and 1998. In total, the U19s have won nine times.

Senior Competition Best and Fairest Awards
 J.N. Woodrow Medal (A Section) - I.Turnbull 1962; J.Nelson 1964-5 (3 total); G.T. Moore Medal
 B Section - J.Nelson 1959 & 1961 (1 Medallist/2 Medals); L.S. Zachariah Medal (
 C Grade - L.Boyd-Gerny 1938; J.Nelson 1960; R.Skinner 1994; M.White 2004 (4 total)
 Division 2 - Tim Harper 2015

Notable players
Keith Truscott
Neil Roberts
Ken Albiston

References

External links
 Official site

Australian rules football clubs in Melbourne
Victorian Amateur Football Association clubs
1907 establishments in Australia
Australian rules football clubs established in 1907
Sport in the City of Stonnington
Melbourne High School